Wang Xijue (1534–1614) was a Ming dynasty court official in China. In a 1593 report to the emperor, he wrote: "The venerable elders of my home district explain that the reason grain is cheap despite poor harvests in recent years is due entirely to the scarcity of silver coin. The national government requires silver for taxes but disburses little silver in its expenditures. As the price of grain falls, tillers of the soil receive lower returns on their labors, and thus less land is put into cultivation."

References
The College Board, 2006 AP World History Free Response Questions

1534 births
1614 deaths
Politicians from Suzhou
Senior Grand Secretaries of the Ming dynasty
Ming dynasty scholars
Date of birth unknown
Date of death unknown